CKER-FM is a Canadian radio station, broadcasting at 101.7 FM in Edmonton, Alberta. The station airs a multilingual programming format branded as Connect FM 101.7 and is owned by Akash Broadcasting Inc.

History
CKER-FM first hit the airwaves on November 1, 1980 on the AM dial as Edmonton's first and only multilingual station. It was owned by O.K. Radio Group which is headed up by Roger Charest and Stu Morton. The station operated at 1480 AM with a broadcasting power of 10,000 watts.

In 1982 O.K. Radio Group spun off CKER into a separate company- CKER Radio Ltd., a company that was headed up by Roger Charest as well as other investors.

In 1994, CKER was granted approval by the CRTC to move to the FM band at 101.9 MHz with an ERP of 64,000 watts, on a frequency previously used by CKO from 1978 to 1989. This would later be increased to 100,000 watts. On January 18, 2006, CKER received approval to move from 101.9 to 101.7 MHz in an effort to alleviate interference that was being caused to other stations.

On November 29, 2006, CKER-FM was sold to Rogers Communications who also purchased other stations owned by O.K. Radio Group. Rogers pledged to keep the station the same, with a multilingual format and the World FM branding.

The station was twice named the best multicultural station in 2009 and 2010 at the Canadian Music and Broadcast Industry Awards.

In August 2020, Rogers filed with the CRTC to sell CKER to Akash Broadcasting (owner of CJCN-FM in Surrey, British Columbia). The sale was approved three months later on December 2, with the station being transferred from Rogers to Akash Broadcasting for $6.7 million.

On August 18, 2021, CKER-FM was rebranded from 101.7 World FM to Connect FM 101.7, matching its sister station CJCN-FM in Surrey.

Programming
CKER airs programming in over 10 languages serving over 12 ethnic groups. It has programming in the following languages: Arabic, Cantonese, Filipino, German, Italian, Mandarin, Polish, Punjabi, Spanish and Ukrainian.

References

External links
 
 
 

KER
KER
Radio stations established in 1980
1980 establishments in Alberta
Akash Broadcasting radio stations